Qingyang is a prefecture-level city in eastern Gansu province, China.

Geography and climate
Qingyang is the easternmost prefecture-level division of Gansu and is thus sometimes referred to as "Longdong". It forms an administrative peninsula, as it is surrounded, on all sides but the south, by Shaanxi and Ningxia. It is in the lower middle part of the Yellow River on the loess plateau and is within the eastern Gansu basin. Elevation ranges from 885 to 2082 meters above sea-level. There are 5 major rivers in Qingyang including the Malian, Pu, Hong, Xilang, and Hulu or "Gourd". Their combined annual flow is more than 800 million cubic meters. Bordering prefecture-level cities are:

Shaanxi:
Yulinnorth
Yan'annortheast
Xianyangsoutheast

Gansu:
Pingliangsouth/southwest

Ningxia:
Guyuanwest
Wuzhongnorthwest

Qingyang has a humid continental climate (Köppen Dwb) with monsoonal influences.

History
Qingyang was part of the area where the earliest cultures along the Yellow River developed and was part of the heartland of the Qin state that would eventually unite China. It was also an important place in the communist revolution.

Meteor shower 

In March or April 1490 AD a presumed meteor shower occurred in the Qingyang district. If a meteor shower did occur, it may have been the result of the breakup of an asteroid. At least three surviving Chinese historical records describe a shower during which "stones fell like rain", killing more than 10,000 people. Due to the paucity of detailed information and the lack of surviving meteorites or other physical evidence, researchers have also been unable to definitively state the exact nature of the dramatic event.

Administration
Qingyang has 1 urban district, 7 counties, and 146 towns with a total population of 2,211,191 (2010), only 310,000 of which are urban residents.

Economy
In 2004 Qingyang's GDP was 8.014 Billion RMB, 11.6% growth over the previous year. Average annual urban income was 5130 RMB, rural was 1428 RMB. Petroleum and natural gas are the backbone of Qingyang's economy. Agricultural products include donkeys, Huan County sheep, cattle, Jin jujubes, milk, apricots and other fruits, vegetables, and berries. 69 different kinds of Chinese medicinal plants and herbs are collected or grown here, 25 of which are exported.

Transportation 
Qingyang Xifeng Airport
China National Highway 211
China National Highway 309
G22 Qingdao–Lanzhou Expressway
Xi'an-Pingliang railway (limited service, station at Ning County)

Culture
Qingyang is famous for its rich folk culture. Traditional Chinese art forms such as shadow puppet theater, paper cuts (such as the Qingyang sachet), folk music, and songs are still part of Qingyang's culture.

References

External links
Official Website(Chinese)

 
Prefecture-level divisions of Gansu